Pimlico is a housing development and census-designated place (CDP) in Berkeley County, South Carolina, United States. It was first listed as a CDP prior to the 2020 census with a population of 1,208.

The CDP is in central Berkeley County, on the west bank of the West Branch of the Cooper River.

Demographics

2020 census

Note: the US Census treats Hispanic/Latino as an ethnic category. This table excludes Latinos from the racial categories and assigns them to a separate category. Hispanics/Latinos can be of any race.

References 

Census-designated places in Berkeley County, South Carolina